Okoboji is a city in Dickinson County, Iowa, United States, along the eastern shore of West Okoboji Lake in the Iowa Great Lakes region. At the time of the 2020 census, its population was 768.

Geography

Demographics

2010 census
As of the census of 2010, there were 807 people, 427 households, and 241 families living in the city. The racial makeup of the city was 98.8% White, 0.1%  African American, 0.1% Asian, 0.5% from other races, and 0.5% from two or more races. Hispanic or Latino of any race were 2.6% of the population.

There were 427 households, of which 14.1% had children under the age of 18 living with them, 48.5% were married couples living together, 5.2% had a female householder with no husband present, 2.8% had a male householder with no wife present, and 43.6% were non-families. 35.6% of all households were made up of individuals, and 16.4% had someone living alone who was 65 years of age or older. The average household size was 1.89 and the average family size was 2.39.

The median age in the city was 55.2 years. 11.8% of residents were under the age of 18; 5.3% were between the ages of 18 and 24; 18.6% were from 25 to 44; 35.3% were from 45 to 64; and 29% were 65 years of age or older. The gender makeup of the city was 48.9% male and 51.1% female.

2000 census
As of the census of 2000, there were 820 people, 427 households, and 240 families living in the city. The racial makeup of the city was 98.66% White, 0.12% African American, 0.73% Native American, 0.12% from other races, and 0.37% from two or more races. Hispanic or Latino of any race were 0.73% of the population.

There were 427 households, out of which 16.2% had children under the age of 18 living with them, 50.6% were married couples living together, 3.5% had a female householder with no husband present, and 43.6% were non-families. 38.6% of all households were made up of individuals, and 17.1% had someone living alone who was 65 years of age or older. The average household size was 1.92 and the average family size was 2.50.

In the city, the population was spread out, with 14.3% under the age of 18, 7.2% from 18 to 24, 20.9% from 25 to 44, 30.0% from 45 to 64, and 27.7% who were 65 years of age or older. The median age was 49 years. For every 100 females, there were 100.0 males. For every 100 females age 18 and over, there were 100.9 males.

The median income for a household in the city was $37,500, and the median income for a family was $54,659. Males had a median income of $32,500 versus $24,018 for females. The per capita income for the city was $29,297. About 2.6% of families and 5.3% of the population were below the poverty line, including 5.0% of those under age 18 and 3.8% of those age 65 or over.

Education
Most of the community is served by the Okoboji Community School District. The district was established on July 1, 1988 by the merger of the Arnolds Park and Milford school districts. Okoboji High School in Milford is the local high school.

Tourism

Okoboji is a major summer tourism area.  A growing number of resorts around the Iowa Great Lakes and the proximity of other tourist-friendly sites, such as Arnolds Park and Spirit Lake, have contributed to its growing popularity.  Okoboji has also become a recognizable name around the country due to the sales of  many products that proudly display the town name in bold letters. Visitors to Okoboji will immediately notice bumper stickers, mugs, and sweatshirts touting the fictitious University of Okoboji where many locals claim to have received an education. University of Okoboji T-shirts or sweatshirts are popular with college students in the Midwest.

References

External links
 Official city website

Cities in Dickinson County, Iowa
Cities in Iowa